The name Edna has been used to name seven tropical cyclones worldwide.

Atlantic Ocean:
 Hurricane Edna (1953)
 Hurricane Edna (1954)
 Tropical Storm Edna (1968)

Western Pacific Ocean:
 Tropical Storm Edna (1945)

South-West Indian Ocean:
 Cyclone Edna (1964)

Australian Region:
 Cyclone Edna (1980)
 Cyclone Edna (2014)

Edna
Edna
Edna
Edna